The history of human sexuality studies the sexual behaviour of individuals in the past, and how societies influenced the conception and experience of sexual behaviours and thoughts.

The study of the history of human sexuality

The work of Swiss jurist Johann Bachofen made a major impact on the study of the history of sexuality. Many authors, notably Lewis Henry Morgan and Friedrich Engels, were influenced by Bachofen, and criticized Bachofen's ideas on the subject, which were almost entirely drawn from a close reading of ancient mythology. In his 1861 book Mother Right: An Investigation of the Religious and Juridical Character of Matriarchy in the Ancient World Bachofen writes that in the beginning human sexuality was chaotic and promiscuous.

This "aphroditic" stage was replaced by a matriarchal "demeteric" stage, which resulted from the mother being the only reliable way of establishing descendants. Only upon the switch to male-enforced monogamy was certainty about paternity possible, giving rise to patriarchy—the ultimate "apolloan" stage of humanity. While the views of Bachofen are not based on empirical evidence, they are important because of the impact they made on thinkers to come, especially in the field of cultural anthropology.

Modern explanations of the origins of human sexuality are based in evolutionary biology, and specifically the field of human behavioral ecology. Evolutionary biology shows that the human genotype, like that of all other organisms, is the result of those ancestors who reproduced with greater frequency than others. The resultant sexual behavior adaptations are thus not an "attempt" on the part of the individual to maximize reproduction in a given situation—natural selection does not "see" into the future. Instead, current behavior is probably the result of selective forces that occurred in the Pleistocene.

For example, a man trying to have sex with many women all while avoiding parental investment is not doing so because he wants to "increase his fitness", but because the psychological framework that evolved and thrived in the Pleistocene never went away.

Sources
Sexual speech—and by extension, writing—has been subject to varying standards of decorum since the beginning of history. For most of historic time writing has not been used by more than a small part of the total population of any society. The resulting self-censorship and euphemistic forms translate today into a dearth of explicit and accurate evidence on which to base a history. There are a number of primary sources that can be collected across a wide variety of times and cultures, including the following:
 Records of legislation indicating either encouragement or prohibition
 Religious and philosophical texts recommending, condemning or debating the topic
 Literary sources, perhaps unpublished during their authors' lifetimes, including diaries and personal correspondence
 Medical textbooks treating various forms as a pathological condition
 Linguistic developments, particularly in slang.
 More recently, studies of sexuality

Sex in various cultures

India

India played a significant role in the history of sex, from writing one of the first literatures that treated sexual intercourse as a science, to in modern times being the origin of the philosophical focus of new-age groups' attitudes on sex. It may be argued that India pioneered the use of sexual education through art and literature. As in many societies, there was a difference in sexual practices in India between common people and powerful rulers, with people in power often indulging in hedonistic lifestyles that were not representative of common moral attitudes. Many of the common (and not so common) sexual practices in the world today, such as the custom and art of kissing, emerged in India, proliferating with early forms of globalization.

The first evidence of attitudes towards sex comes from the ancient texts of Hinduism, Buddhism and Jainism, the first of which are perhaps the oldest surviving literature in the world. These most ancient texts, the Vedas, reveal moral perspectives on sexuality, marriage and fertility prayers. Sex magic featured in a number of Vedic rituals, most significantly in the Asvamedha Yajna, where the ritual culminated with the chief queen lying with the dead horse in a simulated sexual act; clearly a fertility rite intended to safeguard and increase the kingdom's productivity and martial prowess. The epics of ancient India, the Ramayana and Mahabharata, which may have been first composed as early as 1400 BCE, had a huge effect on the culture of Asia, influencing later Chinese, Japanese, Tibetan and South East Asian culture. These texts support the view that in ancient India, sex was considered a mutual duty between a married couple, where husband and wife pleasured each other equally, but where sex was considered a private affair, at least by followers of the aforementioned Indian religions. It seems that polygamy was allowed during ancient times. In practice, this seems to have only been practiced by rulers, with common people maintaining a monogamous marriage. It is common in many cultures for a ruling class to practice polygamy as a way of preserving dynastic succession.

The most publicly known sexual literature of India are the texts of the Kama Sutra. These texts were written for and kept by the philosopher, warrior and nobility castes, their servants and concubines, and those in certain religious orders. These were people that could also read and write and had instruction and education. The sixty four arts of love-passion-pleasure began in India. There are many different versions of the arts which began in Sanskrit and were translated into other languages, such as Persian or Tibetan. Many of the original texts are missing and the only clue to their existence is in other texts. Kama Sutra, the version by Vatsyayana, is one of the well-known survivors and was first translated into English by Sir Richard Burton and F. F. Arbuthnot. The Kama Sutra is now perhaps the most widely read secular text in the world. It details ways in which partners should pleasure each other within a marital relationship.

When the Islamic and Victorian English culture arrived in India, they generally had an adverse impact on sexual liberalism in India. Within the context of the Indian religions, or dharmas, such as Hinduism, Buddhism, Jainism and Sikhism, sex is generally either seen as a moral duty of each partner in a long term marriage relationship to the other, or is seen as a desire which hinders spiritual detachment, and so must be renounced. In modern India, a renaissance of sexual liberalism has occurred amongst the well-educated urban population, but there is still discrimination and forced marriage remains in practice amongst the poor (forced marriage exists along a broad continuum of coercion, and the boundary between forced marriage and arranged marriage is not always agreed upon, even in the present-day context of the 2011 Istanbul Convention or the 2013 United Nations Human Rights Council resolution recognizing forced marriage as a form of human rights abuse).

Within certain schools of Indian philosophy, such as Tantra, the emphasis in sex as a sacred duty, or even a path to spiritual enlightenment or yogic balance is greatly emphasized. Actual sexual intercourse is not a part of every form of tantric practice, but it is the definitive feature of left-hand Tantra. Contrary to popular belief, "Tantric sex" is not always slow and sustained, and may end in orgasm. For example, the Yoni Tantra states: "there should be vigorous copulation". However, all tantra states that there were certain groups of personalities who were not fit for certain practices. Tantra was personality specific and insisted that those with pashu-bhava (animal disposition), which are people of dishonest, promiscuous, greedy or violent natures who ate meat and indulged in intoxication, would only incur bad karma by following Tantric paths without the aid of a Guru who could instruct them on the correct path. In Buddhist tantra, actual ejaculation is very much a taboo, as the main goal of the sexual practice is to use the sexual energy towards achieving full enlightenment, rather than ordinary pleasure. Tantric sex is considered to be a pleasurable experience in Tantra philosophy.

China

In the I Ching (The Book of Changes, a Chinese classic text dealing with divination) sexual intercourse is one of two fundamental models used to explain the world. With neither embarrassment nor circumlocution, Heaven is described as having sexual intercourse with Earth. Similarly, with no sense of prurient interest, the male lovers of early Chinese men of great political power are mentioned in one of the earliest great works of philosophy and literature, the Zhuang Zi (or Chuang Tzu, as it is written in the old system of romanization).

China has had a long history of sexism, with even moral leaders such as Confucius giving extremely pejorative accounts of the innate characteristics of women. From early times, the virginity of women was rigidly enforced by family and community and linked to the monetary value of women as a kind of commodity (the "sale" of women involving the delivery of a bride price). Men were protected in their own sexual adventures by a transparent double standard. While the first wife of a man with any kind of social status in traditional society was almost certainly chosen for him by his father and/or grandfather, the same man might later secure for himself more desirable sexual partners with the status of concubines. In addition, bondservants in his possession could also be sexually available to him. Naturally, not all men had the financial resources to so greatly indulge themselves.

Chinese literature displays a long history of interest in affection, marital bliss, unabashed sexuality, romance, amorous dalliances, homosexual alliances—in short, all of the aspects of behavior that are affiliated with sexuality in the West. Besides the previously mentioned Zhuang Zi passages, sexuality is exhibited in other works of literature such as the Tang dynasty Yingying zhuan (Biography of Cui Yingying), the Qing dynasty Fu sheng liu ji (Six Chapters of a Floating Life), the humorous and intentionally salacious Jin Ping Mei, and the multi-faceted and insightful Hong lou meng (Dream of the Red Chamber, also called Story of the Stone). Of the above, only the story of Yingying and her de facto husband Zhang fail to describe homosexual as well as heterosexual interactions. The novel entitled Rou bu tuan (Prayer mat of flesh) even describes cross-species organ transplants for the sake of enhanced sexual performance. Among Chinese literature are the Taoist classical texts. This philosophical tradition of China has developed Taoist Sexual Practices which have three main goals: health, longevity, and spiritual development.

The desire for respectability and the belief that all aspects of human behavior might be brought under government control has until recently mandated to official Chinese spokesmen that they maintain the fiction of sexual fidelity in marriage, absence of any great frequency of premarital sexual intercourse, and total absence in China of the so-called "decadent capitalist phenomenon" of homosexuality. The result of the ideological demands preventing objective examination of sexual behavior in China has, until very recently, made it extremely difficult for the government to take effective action against sexually transmitted diseases, especially AIDS. At the same time, large migrations to the cities coupled with China's gender imbalance and significant amounts of unemployment have led to resurgence of prostitution in unregulated venues, a prominent accelerant of the propagation of STDs to many ordinary members of society.

In recent decades the power of the family over individuals has weakened, making it increasingly possible for young men and women to find their own sexual and/or marriage partners.

Japan

In what is often called the world's first novel, the Genji Monogatari (Tale of Genji), which dates back to around the eighth century AD, eroticism is treated as a central part of the aesthetic life of the nobility. The sexual interactions of Prince Genji are described in great detail, in an objective tone of voice, and in a way that indicates that sexuality was as much a valued component of cultured life as music or any of the arts. While most of his erotic interactions involve women, there is one telling episode in which Genji travels a fairly long distance to visit one of the women with whom he occasionally consorts but finds her away from home. It being late, and intercourse already being on the menu of the day, Genji takes pleasure in the availability of the lady's younger brother who, he reports, is equally satisfactory as an erotic partner.

From that time on to at least as late as the Meiji Reformation, there is no indication that sexuality was treated in a pejorative way. In modern times homosexuality was driven out of sight until it reemerged in the wake of the sexual revolution with seemingly little if any need for a period of acceleration. Yukio Mishima, probably the best-known Japanese writer in the outside world, frequently wrote about homosexuality, and its relationship with Japanese culture new and old. Likewise, prostitution, pornography, the tradition of the Geisha, and countless types of fetish and sadomasochism have resurfaced after decades underground.

In Japan, sexuality was governed by the same social forces that make its culture considerably different from that of China, Korea, India, or Europe. In Japanese society, the primary method used to secure social control is the threat of ostracism. Japanese society is still very much a shame society.  More attention is paid to what is polite or appropriate to show others than to which behaviors might make a person seem "corrupt" or "guilty", in the Christian sense of the words. The tendency of people in Japanese society to group in terms of "in groups" and "out groups" - residue of its long history as a caste society—is a source of great pressure on every facet of society, via pop culture (reflected in the tribal, often materialistic, and very complex nature of teenage subcultures) as well as more traditional standards (as in the high-pressure role of the salaryman). Sexual expression ranges from a requirement to a complete taboo, and many, especially teenagers, find themselves playing many otherwise strictly-separate roles during the week.

A frequent locus of misconceptions in regard to Japanese sexuality is the institution of the geisha. Rather than being a prostitute, a geisha was a woman trained in arts such as music and cultured conversation, and who was available for non-sexual interactions with her male clientele. These women differed from the wives that their patrons probably had at home because, except for the geisha, women were ordinarily not expected to be prepared for anything other than the fulfillment of household duties. This limitation imposed by the normal social role of the majority of women in traditional society produced a diminution in the pursuits that those women could enjoy, but also a limitation in the ways that a man could enjoy the company of his wife. The geisha fulfilled the non-sexual social roles that ordinary women were prevented from fulfilling, and for this service they were well paid. The geisha were not deprived of opportunities to express themselves sexually and in other erotic ways. A geisha might have a patron with whom she enjoyed sexual intimacy, but this sexual role was not part of her role or responsibility as a geisha.

As a superficial level, in traditional Japanese society women were expected to be highly subservient to men and especially to their husbands. So, in a socionormal description of their roles, they were little more than housekeepers and faithful sexual partners to their husbands. Their husbands, on the other hand, might consort sexually with whomever they chose outside of the family, and a major part of male social behavior involves after-work forays to places of entertainment in the company of male cohorts from the workplace—places that might easily offer possibilities of sexual satisfaction outside the family. In the postwar period this side of Japanese society has seen some liberalization in regard to the norms imposed on women as well as an expansion of the de facto powers of women in the family and in the community that existed unacknowledged in traditional society.

In the years since people first became aware of the AIDS epidemic, Japan has not suffered the high rates of disease and death that characterize, for example, some nations in Africa, some nations in Southeast Asia, etc. In 1992, the government of Japan justified its continued refusal to allow oral contraceptives to be distributed in Japan on the fear that it would lead to reduced condom use, and thus increase transmission of AIDS. As of 2004, condoms accounted for 80% of birth control use in Japan, and this may explain Japan's comparably lower rates of AIDS.

Classical antiquity

Ancient Greece

In ancient Greece, the phallus, often in the form of a herma, was an object of worship as a symbol of fertility. This finds expression in Greek sculpture and other artworks. One ancient Greek male idea of female sexuality was that women envied penises of males. Wives were considered a commodity and instruments for bearing legitimate children. They had to compete sexually with eromenoi, hetaeras and slaves in their own homes.

Both homosexuality and bisexuality, in the form of ephebophilia (in some ways slavery), were social institutions in ancient Greece, and were integral to education, art, religion, and politics. Relationships between adults were not unknown but they were disfavored. Lesbian relations were also of a pederastic nature.

Ancient Greek men believed that refined prostitution was necessary for pleasure and different classes of prostitutes were available. Hetaera, educated and intelligent companions, were for intellectual as well as physical pleasure, Peripatetic prostitutes solicited business on the streets, whereas temple or consecrated prostitutes charged a higher price. In Corinth, a port city, on the Aegean Sea, the temple held a thousand consecrated prostitutes.

Rape—usually in the context of warfare—was common and was seen by men as a "right of domination". Rape in the sense of "abduction" followed by consensual lovemaking was represented even in religion: Zeus was said to have ravished many women: Leda in the form of a swan, Danaë disguised as a golden rain, Alkmene disguised as her own husband. Zeus also raped a boy, Ganymede, a myth that paralleled Cretan custom.

Etruria
The ancient Etruscans had very different views on sexuality, when compared with the other European ancient peoples, most of whom had inherited the Indo-European traditions and views on the gender roles.

Greek writers, such as Theopompus and Plato named the Etruscan 'immoral' and from their descriptions we find out that the women commonly had sex with men who were not their husbands and that in their society, children were not labelled "illegitimate" just because they did not know who the father was. Theopompus also described orgiastic rituals, but it is not clear whether they were a common custom or only a minor ritual dedicated to a certain deity.

Ancient Rome

In the Roman Republic, the citizen's duty to control his body was central to the concept of male sexuality. "Virtue" (virtus, from vir, "man") was equated with "manliness". The equivalent virtue for female citizens of good social standing was pudicitia, a form of sexual integrity that displayed their attractiveness and self-control. Female sexuality was encouraged within marriage. In Roman patriarchal society, a "real man" was supposed to govern both himself and others well, and should not submit to the use or pleasure of others. Same-sex behaviors were not perceived as diminishing a Roman's masculinity, as long as he played the penetrative or dominating role. Acceptable male partners were social inferiors such as prostitutes, entertainers, and slaves. Sex with freeborn male minors was formally prohibited (see Lex Scantinia). "Homosexual" and "heterosexual" thus did not form the primary dichotomy of Roman thinking about sexuality, and no Latin words for these concepts exist.

Depictions of frank sexuality are abundant in Roman literature and art. The fascinum, a phallic charm, was a ubiquitous decoration. Sexual positions and scenarios are depicted in great variety among the wall paintings preserved at Pompeii and Herculaneum. Collections of poetry celebrated love affairs, and The Art of Love by the Augustan poet Ovid playfully instructed both men and women in how to attract and enjoy lovers. Elaborate theories of human sexuality based on Greek philosophy were developed by thinkers such as Lucretius and Seneca. Classical myths often deal with sexual themes such as gender identity, adultery, incest, and rape.

Like other aspects of Roman life, sexuality was supported and regulated by traditional Roman religion, both the public cult of the state and private religious practices and magic. Cicero held that the desire to procreate (libido) was "the seedbed of the republic", as it was the cause for the first form of social institution, marriage, which in turn created the family, regarded by the Romans as the building block of civilization. Roman law penalized sex crimes (stuprum), particularly rape, as well as adultery. A Roman husband, however, committed the crime of adultery only when his sexual partner was a married woman.

Prostitution was legal, public, and widespread. Entertainers of any gender were assumed to be sexually available (see infamia), and gladiators were sexually glamorous. Slaves lacked legal personhood, and were vulnerable to sexual exploitation.

The dissolution of Republican ideals of physical integrity in relation to political liberty has been hypothesized to contribute to and reflect the sexual license and decadence associated with the Roman Empire. Anxieties about the loss of liberty and the subordination of the citizen to the emperor were expressed by a perceived increase in passive homosexual behavior among free men. Sexual conquest was a frequent metaphor for Roman imperialism.

French Polynesia

The Islands have been noted for their sexual culture. Many sexual activities seen as taboo in western cultures were viewed as appropriate by the native culture. Contact with Western societies has changed many of these customs, so research into their pre-Western social history has to be done by reading antique writings.

Children slept in the same room as their parents and were able to witness their parents while they had sex. Intercourse simulation became real penetration as soon as boys were physically able. Adults found simulation of sex by children to be funny. As children approached 11, attitudes toward girls shifted. Premarital sex was not encouraged but was allowed in general, restrictions on adolescent sexuality were incest, exogamy regulations, and firstborn daughters of high-ranking lineage. After their firstborn child, high-ranking women were permitted extramarital affairs.

Adam Johann von Krusenstern, in his book about the same expedition as Yuri's, reports that a father brought a 10–12-year-old girl on his ship, and she had sex with the crew. According to the book of Charles Pierre Claret de Fleurieu and Étienne Marchand, eight-year-old girls had sex and performed other sexual acts in public.

20th century: sexual revolution

The second sexual revolution was a substantial change in sexual morality and sexual behaviour throughout the West in the 1960s and early 1970s. One factor in the change of values pertaining to sexual activities was the invention of new, efficient technologies for the personal control of ability to enter pregnancy. Prime among them, at that time, was the first birth control pill. Liberalized laws on abortion in many countries likewise made it possible to safely and legally break off an unwanted pregnancy without having to invoke a birth posing grave danger to the health of the mother.

Same-sex relations

Societal attitudes towards same-sex relationships have varied over time and place, from requiring all males to engage in same-sex relationships, to casual integration, through acceptance, to seeing the practice as a minor sin, repressing it through law enforcement and judicial mechanisms, and to proscribing it under penalty of death.

In a detailed compilation of historical and ethnographic materials of pre-industrial cultures, "strong disapproval of homosexuality was reported for 41% of 42 cultures; it was accepted or ignored by 21%, and 12% reported no such concept. Of 70 ethnographies, 59% reported homosexuality absent or rare in frequency and 41% reported it present or not uncommon."

In cultures influenced by Abrahamic religions, the law and the church established sodomy as a transgression against divine law or a crime against nature. The condemnation of anal sex between males, however, predates Christian belief. It was frequent in ancient Greece; "unnatural" can be traced back to Plato.

Many historical figures, including Socrates, Lord Byron, Edward II, and Hadrian, have had terms such as gay or bisexual applied to them; some scholars, such as Michel Foucault, have regarded this as risking the anachronistic introduction of a contemporary construction of sexuality foreign to their times, though others challenge this.

A common thread of constructionist argument is that no one in antiquity or the Middle Ages experienced homosexuality as an exclusive, permanent, or defining mode of sexuality. John Boswell has countered this argument by citing ancient Greek writings by Plato, which describe individuals exhibiting exclusive homosexuality.

Religion and sex

Abrahamic religions
Abrahamic religions (namely Judaism, Samaritanism, Christianity, the Baháʼí Faith, and Islam) have traditionally affirmed and endorsed a patriarchal and heteronormative approach towards human sexuality, favouring exclusively penetrative vaginal intercourse between men and women within the boundaries of marriage over all other forms of human sexual activity, including autoeroticism, masturbation, oral sex, anal sex, non-penetrative and non-heterosexual sexual intercourse (all of which have been labeled as "sodomy" at various times), believing and teaching that such behaviors are forbidden because they're considered sinful, and further compared to or derived from the behavior of the alleged residents of Sodom and Gomorrah. However, the status of LGBT people in early Christianity and early Islam is debated.

Judaism
In Jewish law, sex is not considered intrinsically sinful or shameful when conducted in marriage, nor is it a necessary evil for the purpose of procreation. Sex is considered a private and holy act between a husband and wife. Certain deviant sexual practices, enumerated below, were considered gravely immoral "abominations" sometimes punishable by death. The residue of sex was considered ritually unclean outside the body, and required ablution.

Recently, some scholars have questioned whether the Old Testament banned all forms of homosexuality, raising issues of translation and references to ancient cultural practices. However, rabbinic Judaism had unambiguously condemned homosexuality.

And God blessed them, and God said to them, "Be fruitful and multiply and fill the earth and subdue it, and rule over the fish of the sea and over the fowl of the sky and over all the beasts that tread upon the earth. (Genesis 1:28)

The Torah, while being quite frank in its description of various sexual acts, forbids certain relationships. Namely, adultery, all forms of incest, male homosexuality, bestiality, and introduced the idea that one should not have sex during the wife's period:
You shall not lie carnally with your neighbor's wife, to become defiled by her. (Lev. 18:20)
Thou shalt not lie with mankind, as with womankind: it is abomination. (Lev. 18:22)
And with no animal shall you cohabit, to become defiled by it. And a woman shall not stand in front of an animal to cohabit with it; this is depravity. (Lev. 18:23)
And to a woman during the uncleanness of her separation, you shall not come near to uncover her nakedness. (Lev. 18:19)

The above passages may, however, be open to modern interpretation. The original meanings of these verses did not change, but their interpretation may have changed after they were translated into English and other languages. This view however, has been counteracted by conservatives.

Christianity
Christianity re-emphasised the Jewish attitudes on sexuality with two new concepts. First, there was the re-iterated idea that marriage was absolutely exclusive and indissoluble, placing further guidance on divorce and expanding on the reasons and principles behind those laws. Second, in Old Testament times marriage was almost universal, in continuity with the total matrimony in Eden, but in the New Testament, the trajectory is extended forward to the goal of no marriage in the new heavens and new earth (see Matthew 22).

The New Testament is quite clear on principles regarding sexual relations. In one of his letters to the Corinthian church, Paul directly answers some questions they had asked about this.

Paul is speaking into a situation where the church was falling into lust, and some members even using prostitutes (6:16), while others advocated a 'higher spirituality' that wrongly denied pleasure from earthly things, including abstinence from sex (7:1). Paul writes to them to explain the right context for sex in marriage, and the importance of couples keeping having sex and giving each other pleasure, but encourages them to pursue celibacy (as he later explains [7:32-35], so that they may devote more time and energy to others) wherever God has granted that gift (7:7).

Many other passages refer to sex or marriage. Augustine of Hippo opined that before Adam's fall, there was no lust in the sexual act, but that it was entirely subordinate to human reason. Later theologians similarly concluded that the lust involved in sexuality was a result of original sin, but nearly all agreed that this was only a venial sin if conducted within marriage without inordinate lust.

In Reformed schools, as represented for example by the Westminster Confession, three purposes of marriage are drawn out: for mutual encouragement, support, and pleasure; for having children; and to prevent lustful sin.

Today, many Christians have adopted the view that there is no sin whatsoever in the uninhibited enjoyment of marital relations. Some Christians will tend to limit the circumstances and degree to which sexual pleasure is morally licit, for example to build self-control to prevent sex becoming addictive, or as a fast.

Islam
In Islam, sexual intercourse is allowed only after marriage and not considered intrinsically sinful or shameful when conducted in marriage. Certain deviant sexual practices are considered gravely immoral "abominations" sometimes punishable by death. The full body ablution is required before performing prayers subsequent to coitus.

If a Muslim engaged in sexual intercourse with any other than the spouse, then this would be considered sinful, and a crime, and such extra-marital intercourse, referred to as zina in the Qur'an is punishable in few countries that fully practice Islamic law (Sharia) by corporal punishment of 100 lashes if the person is unmarried (fornication) and by death if the person is married to another (adultery). This only if the actual copulation is witnessed by four people who will attest to such, and as per Qur'an text if the accuser cannot bring four witnesses the punishment is 80 lashes for making unsubstantiated accusations. Generally this means the punishments are not carried out unless the culprits themselves confess to the sin on four separate occasions and therefore are liable to be punished for the crime.

Dharmic religions

Hinduism

In India, Hinduism accepted an open attitude towards sex as an art, science and spiritual practice. The most famous pieces of Indian literature on sex are Kamasutra (Aphorisms on Love) and Kamashastra (from Kama = pleasure, shastra = specialised knowledge or technique). This collection of explicit sexual writings, both spiritual and practical, covers most aspects of human courtship and sexual intercourse. It was put together in this form by the sage Vatsyayana from a 150 chapter manuscript that had itself been distilled from 300 chapters that had in turn come from a compilation of some 100,000 chapters of text. The Kamasutra is thought to have been written in its final form sometime between the third and fifth century AD, based on circumstantial evidence.

Also notable are the sculptures carved on temples in India, particularly the Khajuraho temple. The frank depiction of uninhibited sex hints towards a liberated society and times where people believed in dealing openly with all aspects of life. On the other hand, a group of thinkers believe that depiction of sexually implicit carvings outside the temples indicate that one should enter the temples leaving desires (kama).

Apart from Vatsyayana's Kamashastra, which is no doubt the most famous of all such writings, there exist a number of other books, for example:
The Ratirahasya, literal translation—secrets (rahasya) of love (rati, the union);
The Panchasakya, or the five (panch) arrows (sakya);
The Ratimanjari, or the garland (manjari) of love (rati, the union)
The Ananga Ranga, or the stage of love.

The Secrets of Love was written by a poet named Kukkoka. He is believed to have written this treatise on his work to please one Venudutta, considered to be a king. This work was translated into Hindi years ago and the author's name became Koka in short and the book he wrote was called Koka Shastra. The same name crept into all the translations into other languages in India. Koka Shastra literally means doctrines of Koka, which is identical with the Kama Shastra, or doctrines of love, and the names Koka Shastra and Kama Shastra are used indiscriminately.

Technology and sex

In the mid 20th century advances in medical science and modern understanding of the menstrual cycle led to observational, surgical, chemical and laboratory techniques to allow diagnosis and the treatment of many forms of infertility.

Zoophilia

Zoophilia or bestiality—sexual activity between humans and animals—probably dates back to prehistory. Depictions of humans and animals in a sexual context appear infrequently in rock art in Europe beginning around the onset of the Neolithic and the domestication of animals. Bestiality remained a common theme in mythology and folklore through the classical period and into the Middle Ages (e.g. Leda and the Swan) and several ancient authors purported to document it as a regular, accepted practice—albeit usually in "other" cultures.

Explicit legal prohibition of human sexual contact with animals is a legacy of the Abrahamic religions: the Hebrew Bible imposes the death penalty on both the person and animal involved in an act of bestiality. There are several examples known from medieval Europe of people and animals executed for committing bestiality. With the Age of Enlightenment, bestiality was subsumed with other sexual "crimes against nature" into civil sodomy laws, usually remaining a capital crime.

Bestiality remains illegal in most countries. Though religious and "crime against nature" arguments may still be used to justify this, today the central issue is the ability of non-human animals to give consent: it is argued that sex with animals is inherently abusive. In common with many paraphilias, the internet has allowed the formation of a zoophile community that has begun to lobby for zoophilia to be considered an alternative sexuality and for the legalisation of bestiality.

Prostitution

Prostitution is the sale of sexual services, such as oral sex or sexual intercourse. Prostitution has been described as the "world's oldest profession". Gonorrhoeae is recorded at least up to 700 years ago and associated with a district in Paris formerly known as "Le Clapiers". This is where the prostitutes were to be found at that time.

In ancient Greece the hetaerae were often women of high social class, whereas in Rome the meretrices were of lower social order. The Devadasi, prostitutes of Hindu temples in south India, were made illegal by the Indian government in 1988.

Sexually transmitted diseases

For much of human history, sexually transmitted diseases have been a scourge of humanity. They raged unchecked through society until the discovery of antibiotics. The development of inexpensive condoms and education about sexually transmitted diseases has helped reduce risks. For a period of about thirty years (in the second half of the twentieth century) their threat subsided. However, due to the free movement of people and uncontrolled distribution of antibiotics, organisms resistant to antibiotics quickly spread and at the present time pose a threat to people who have more than one sex partner.

AIDS

AIDS has profoundly changed modern sexuality. It was first noticed (although some historians think that the first case was in 1959) spreading among gay men and intravenous drug users in the 1970s and 1980s. Today, the majority of victims are heterosexual women, men, and children in developing countries. In most developing countries, fear of epidemic has drastically changed many aspects of twentieth century human sexuality. Fear of contracting AIDS has driven a revolution in sex education, which now centers far more the use of protection and abstinence, and spends much more time discussing sexually transmitted diseases.

Further effects of this disease run deep, radically impacting the expected average lifespan as reported by the BBC News: "[The expected average lifespan] is falling in many African countries—a girl born today in Sierra Leone could expect only to live to 36, in contrast to Japan, where today's newborn girl might reach 85 on average."

See also

Bisexuality in the United States
Cultural history of the buttocks
European sexuality leading up to and during World War II
History of bisexuality
History of gay men in the United States
History of lesbianism in the United States
History of lesbianism
Homosexuality in ancient Greece
Homosexuality in ancient Rome
Homosexuality in China
Homosexuality in India
Homosexuality in Japan
Kagema
Kamashastra
Lesbian pulp fiction
LGBT history
LGBT history in the United States
Gay male pulp fiction
History of feminism
History of erotic depictions
Homophobia
Pederasty
Pederasty in ancient Greece
Pedophilia
Persecution of homosexuals in Nazi Germany
Polyamory
Pornography
Pornocracy
Sexual orientation
Asexuality
Sexual revolution in 1960s America
Sexuality in ancient Rome
Sexual revolution
The History of Sexuality (book series)
Timeline of LGBT history
Transphobia

References

Further reading

Foucault, Michel. The History of Sexuality, Volumes 1, 2 and 3. New York: Vintage Books, 1990. 
Hubbard, Thomas K. (ed.) Homosexuality in Greece and Rome: A Sourcebook of Basic Documents, University of California Press, 2003.
Rousseau, George and Roy Porter. Sexual Underworlds of the Enlightenment (Chapel Hill:  The University of North Carolina Press, 1987).

External links
Sex Scrolls – Journey through the hormones of history 
History of Sexuality
University of California, Santa Barbara's SexInfo
Hers and History of Sexuality

Sexual orientation
The Invention of Heterosexuality by Jonathan Katz
Encyclopedia of GLBQT culture
Who's Gay? What's Straight?
The Myth of Ancient Greek Sexuality by Bruce Thornton

 
LGBT history